Julia Ward may refer to:

In people
 Julia Ward Howe (1819-1910), American poet and author, known for writing "The Battle Hymn of the Republic"
 Julia E. Ward (died 1921), American educator
 Julia Rush Cutler Ward (1796-1824), American occasional poet
 Julia Ward (1900-1962), American cryptographer

In other uses
 Julia Ward Howe School, historic school located in Philadelphia, Pennsylvania, USA

See also
 Julie Ward (disambiguation)